Grumo Appula is a town and comune of the Metropolitan City of Bari, Apulia, southern Italy.

The town is a few kilometers inland from the port of Bari on the Adriatic Sea and has a population of about 12,200.

People 
Francesco Colasuonno (1925-2003), cardinal and Vatican diplomat
Sergio Rubini (1959-), actor and film director
Francesco Laforgia (1978-), politician
Nicola Ventola (1978-), footballer
Massimo Stano (1992-), Olympic champion racewalking

References

Cities and towns in Apulia